Four Guns was an Oglala Lakota tribal judge of the late 19th century. He was critical of the "white man's" tradition of writing.

Oral tradition
Four Guns was known for justifying the oral tradition and was critical of the written word. He said, "We are puzzled as to what service all this writing serves. The Indian needs no writings; words that are true sink deep into his heart where they remain; he never forgets them. On the other hand, the white man loses his papers, he is helpless." He used humor in his remarks to identify with his audience, saying "I once heard one of their preachers say that no white man was admitted to heaven, unless there were writings about him a great book."

Speeches
Four Guns reflects the primary characteristic of Indian speech making, that Indians chose their words carefully and placed great emphasis on remembering what was said.

In 1891, Four Guns and two fellow Oglala judges, Pine Tree and Running Wolf, were invited to dine with Clark Wissler, an anthropologist.
After the dinner, Four Guns made a statement about oral traditions and the written word that reads, in part:

References

Lakota leaders